Bible Belt is an informal term for a region in the southeastern and south-central United States in which socially conservative evangelical Protestantism is a significant part of the culture.

The term is also used more generically for a similar region in any country that is more conservative and religious than the country as a whole, such as:

Bible Belt (Netherlands) (Dutch: bijbelgordel or biblebelt), a long strip of land across the Netherlands, with significant number of conservative Calvinist Protestants.
Bible Belt (Sweden) (Swedish: bibelbältet), an area in southern Sweden around Jönköping, which is more religious (evangelical or conservative Lutheran) than most other locations in the country.
Bible Belt (Norway) (Norwegian: bibelbeltet), the southwestern coastal area of Norway between Aust-Agder and Møre og Romsdal, which is more religious than most of the country. There is also a separate "Little Bible Belt"  (lille bibelbeltet) in the southeast near the Swedish border, covering Rømskog, Marker and Aremark.

Music 
Bible Belt (album), debut album by soul singer-songwriter Diane Birch
"Bible Belt", song by Travis Tritt on the album It's All About to Change

See also
 Quran Belt

Belt regions